Galley Run is a  long 2nd order tributary to the Youghiogheny River in Fayette County, Pennsylvania. This is the only stream of this name in the United States.

Course
Galley Run rises about 0.5 miles west of Owensdale, Pennsylvania, and then flows south to join the Youghiogheny River at Broad Ford.

Watershed
Galley Run drains  of area, receives about 42.3 in/year of precipitation, has a wetness index of 364.53, and is about 40% forested.

References

 
Tributaries of the Ohio River
Rivers of Pennsylvania
Rivers of Fayette County, Pennsylvania
Allegheny Plateau